Cappel may refer to:

 Cappel, Moselle, a commune in Lorraine, France
 Cappel, Lower Saxony, a municipality in Lower Saxony, Germany
 Cappel, Marburg
 the Cappel family, French 15th-17th century jurists and theologians

See also 
 Kappel